The Women's 60 m wheelchair 1A was one of the events held in Athletics at the 1972 Summer Paralympics in Heidelberg.

5 competitors competed in a single race.

Mayer of West Germany won the gold medal.

Results

Final

References 

Wheelchair